Pokonji Dol is an islet in the Croatian part of the Adriatic Sea, which is situated 500 meters south from Hvar. Pokonji Dol is one of the Paklinski islands. The lighthouse in the middle of the islet was built in 1872. Because Pokonji Dol is the easternmost island of the Paklinski otoci archipelago, the lighthouse ensures the safe navigation of vessels coming from the open sea.

See also
List of lighthouses in Croatia

References

External links

Islets of Croatia
Islands of the Adriatic Sea
Lighthouses in Croatia
Landforms of Split-Dalmatia County